γ-Octalactone is a lactone and aroma compound with the chemical formula C8H14O2. It has a coconut flavor.

References 

Gamma-lactones